Hibiscus schizopetalus is a species of Hibiscus native to tropical eastern Africa in Kenya, Tanzania and Mozambique. Its common names include fringed rosemallow, Japanese lantern, coral hibiscus, and spider hibiscus.

Description

The red or pink flowers are very distinctive in their frilly, finely divided petals. 
Flowers with finely dissected petal have a range of colours, the most common being the red form (Keena et al., 2002; Ng, 2006). Leaves resemble those of H. rosa-sinensis.

The major anthocyanin found in flowers of H. schizopetalus is cyanidin-3-sambusophoroside (Lowry, 1976). From leaves, two new triterpene esters have been isolated (Jose & Vijayan, 2006).

Uses

Cultivation
Hibiscus schizopetalus is cultivated as an ornamental plant, for use in tropical and subtropical gardens. In temperate climates it does not tolerate temperatures below  (RHS hardiness rating H1B); but can be placed outside during the summer months, in a sheltered spot with full sun, in alkaline or neutral soil. It has received the Royal Horticultural Society's Award of Garden Merit.

Gallery

References

External links

Jose, E.A. & Vijayan, K.K. (2006). “New taraxerane esters from Hibiscus schizopetalus leaves”. Indian Journal of Chemistry, Section B Organic and Medicinal Chemistry 45(5): 1328–1331.
Keena, C., Yanker-Hansen, K., Marcos Capelini, M. (2002). “Marvellous mallows”. http://www.internationalhibiscussociety.org/hiv1n11-1.htm#1. 
Lowry, J.B. (1976). “Floral anthocyanins of some Malesian Hibiscus species”. Phytochemistry 15: 1395–1396.
Ng, F.S.P. 2006. “Tropical Horticulture and Gardening”. Clearwater Publications, Kuala Lumpur, Malaysia. 361 pp.

schizopetalus
Flora of East Tropical Africa
Flora of Kenya
Flora of Mozambique
Flora of Tanzania
Garden plants of Africa